The Seigneur of Sark is the head of Sark in the Channel Islands. "Seigneur" is the French word for "lord", and a female head of Sark is called Dame of Sark, of which there have been three. The husband of a female ruler of Sark is not a consort but is jure uxoris ("by right of (his) wife") a seigneur himself.

Description

The Seigneur's office is hereditary, but with permission of the Crown, it may be mortgaged or sold, as happened in 1849 when Pierre Carey le Pelley sold the fief to Marie Collings for £6,000.

The Seigneur was, before the constitutional reforms of 2008, the head of the feudal government of Sark, with the British monarch being the feudal overlord. The Seigneur had a suspensive veto power and the right to appoint most of the island's officers. Many of the laws, particularly those related to inheritance and the rule of the Seigneur, had changed little since Queen Elizabeth I, by Letters Patent, granted a fiefdom to Hellier de Carteret in 1565.

The residents of Sark voted to introduce a fully elected legislature to replace the feudal government in a 2006 referendum, and the law change was approved on 9 April 2008. The first democratic election was held on 10 December 2008. The changes in the political system mostly apply to the parliament, the Chief Pleas, not to the Seigneur.

Many seigneurs are buried at St. Peter's Anglican Church, Sark.

Seigneurs of Sark

 Hellier de Carteret (1563–1578)
 Philippe de Carteret I (1578–1594)
 Philippe de Carteret II (1594–1643)
 Philippe de Carteret III (1643–1663)
 Philippe de Carteret IV (1663–1693)
 Charles de Carteret (1693–1715)
 John Carteret (1715–1720)
 John Johnson (1720–1723)
 James Milner (1723–1730)
 Susanne le Pelley (1730–1733)
 Nicolas le Pelley (1733–1742)
 Daniel le Pelley (1742–1752)
 Pierre le Pelley I (1752–1778)
 Pierre le Pelley II (1778–1820)
 Pierre le Pelley III (1820–1839)
 Ernest le Pelley (1839–1849)
 Pierre Carey le Pelley (1849–1852)
 Marie Collings (1852–1853)
 William Thomas Collings (1853–1882)
 William Frederick Collings (1882–1927)
 Sibyl Hathaway (1927–1974)Robert Hathaway (1929–1954)
 Michael Beaumont (1974–2016)
 Christopher Beaumont (2016–present)

The heir apparent to the seigneurship is the present seigneur's son, Hugh Rees-Beaumont.

Gallery

References

Sark
Sark
 
Sark